Sun God is a monumental statue by French-American sculptor Niki de Saint Phalle located on the campus of the University of California San Diego.

Erected in February 1983 as the first of the Stuart Collection of public art projects, the polyester and fiberglass Sun God has become a notable feature of the UCSD campus. It is located on a grassy area between the Faculty Club and Mandeville Auditorium, on the eastern periphery of the John Muir College campus. 

Since the 1980s, the UCSD Associated Students organization has sponsored an annual event, the Sun God Festival, with the statue as its official mascot. Over the years, numerous visual-arts students have accessorized the statue with items such as sunglasses; a cap and gown; an ID card; a large, water-spraying phallus; and even a nest with eggs painted in the statue's trademark bright colors.

References

External links
 Niki de Saint Phalle Sun God, 1983, photo gallery

Outdoor sculptures in San Diego
University of California, San Diego
1983 sculptures
Fiberglass sculptures in California
1983 establishments in California
Stuart Collection